Forficula riffensis is a species of earwig.

References

Forficulidae
Insects described in 1909